This is a list of most of the exhibitions of Olafur Eliasson (born in 1967, Copenhagen).

Solo exhibitions

1994

 Stalke Galleri, Copenhagen
 No Days in Winter, No Nights in Summer, Forumgalleriet, Malmö
 Einige erinnern sich, dass sie auf dem Weg waren diese Nacht, Galerie Lukas & Hoffmann, Cologne

1995 
 Eine Beschreibung einer Reflexion oder aber eine angenehme Übung zu deren Eigenschaften, neugerriemschneider, Berlin
 Künstlerhaus Stuttgart
 Thoka, Kunstverein in Hamburg
 Tommy Lund Galerie, Odense

1996 
 Your Strange Certainty Still Kept, Tanya Bonakdar Gallery, New York
 Your Foresight Endured, Galleria Emi Fontana, Milan
 Tell Me About a Miraculous Invention, Galleri Andreas Brändström, Stockholm; Århus Kunstmuseum
 Malmö Konstmuseum

1997 
 The Curious Garden, Kunsthalle Basel
 Your Sun Machine, Marc Foxx Gallery, Los Angeles
 Stalke Galleri, Copenhagen
 Kunsthalle Levyn, Vienna

1998 
 Galerie für Zeitgenössische Kunst, Leipzig
 Galerie Peter Kilchmann, Zürich
 Yet Untitled, neugerriemschneider, Berlin
 Bonakdar Jancou Gallery, New York
 Kjarvalsstadir, The Reykjavík Art Museum
 Aquarium, Galerie Enja Wonneberger, Kiel
 Fotografier, BildMuseet, Umeå
 Raum für eine Farbe, Kunsthalle Bremen
 Tell me about a miraculous invention, Århus Kunstmuseum

1999 
 Your Position Surrounded and Your Surroundings Positioned, Dundee Contemporary Arts
 Your Circumspection Disclosed, Castello di Rivoli, Museo d'Arte Contemporanea, Turin
 Yet Untitled, Kunstverein Wolfsburg
 Olafur Eliasson, Job Koelewijn, De Appel Foundation, Amsterdam
 Riflessi di una certa importanza, Galleria Emi Fontana, Milan
 Your Double Day Diary, Frankfurter Kunstverein, Frankfurt am Main
 Beauty, Marc Foxx Gallery, Los Angeles
 Galleri Ingólfsstraeti, Reykjavík

2000 
 Surroundings Surrounded, Neue Galerie am Landesmuseum Joanneum, Graz
 The Only Thing That We Have in Common Is That We Are Different, CCA Center for Contemporary Art, Kitakyushu
 Focus: Olafur Eliasson, Your intuitive surroundings versus your surrounded intuition, The Art Institute of Chicago
 The Curious Garden, Irish Museum of Modern Art, Dublin
 Your Now Is My Surroundings, Bonakdar Jancou Gallery, New York
 Your Orange Afterimage Exposed, Gallery Koyanagi, Tokyo
 Your Blue Afterimage Exposed, Masataka Hayakawa Gallery, Tokyo
 The Aldrich Museum of Contemporary Art, Ridgefield, Connecticut
 IASPIS, Stockholm
 Kunstverein Wolfsburg

2001 
 Your Only Real Thing Is Time, The Institute of Contemporary Art, Boston
 The Mediated Motion, Kunsthaus Bregenz
 Surroundings Surrounded, Zentrum für Kunst und Medientechnologie, Karlsruhe
 Projects 73: Olafur Eliasson: Seeing Yourself Sensing, The Museum of Modern Art, New York
 The Structural Evolution Project, Mala Galerija, Ljubljana
 Die Dinge, die du nicht siehst, die du nicht siehst, neugerriemschneider, Berlin
 The Young Land, Barge Project, The Institute of Modern Art, Boston
 Reykjavík Art Festival, Reykjavík
 The Cartographic Series I, Niels Borch Jensen Galerie und Verlag, Berlin

2002 
 Chaque matin je me sens différent, chaque soir je me sens le même, Musée d'Art Moderne de la Ville de Paris
 The Cartographic Series I+II, Niels Borch Jensen Galerie und Verlag, Berlin
 Udsigten der aldrig tænker, Galleri Kirke Sonnerup, Såby
 Overgaden, Copenhagen
 i8 Gallery, Reykjavík

2003 
 Delight and Other Luminous Movements, Galleria Emi Fontana, Milan
 The Weather Project, Tate Modern, London
 The Blind Pavilion, Danish Pavilion, 50th Venice Biennale
 Funcionamiento silencioso, Palacio de Cristal, Parque del Retiro, Museo Nacional centro de Arte Reina Sofia, Madrid
 Sonne statt Regen, Städtische Galerie im Lenbachhaus und Kunstbau, Munich
 Tanya Bonakdar Gallery, New York City
 Museum Boijmans van Beuningen, Rotterdam

2004 
 Ólafur Elíasson: Forgetting, Brändström & Stene, Stockholm
 Ólafur Elíasson: Minding the world, ARoS Århus Kunstmuseum
 Ólafur Elíasson: Your colour memory, Arcadia University Art Gallery, Glenside
 I only see things when they move, Aspen Art Museum
 The Body as Brain. Projekt Sammlung (I), Kunsthaus Zug
 Your Lighthouse. Works with light 1991-2004, Kunstmuseum Wolfsburg
 Ólafur Elíasson: Photographs, The Menil Collection, Houston
 Colour Memory and Other Informal Shadows, Astrup Fearnley Museet for Moderne Kunst, Oslo
 Frost Activity, Hafnarhus, The Reykjavík Art Museum

2005 
 Museum Boijmans van Beuningen, Rotterdam
 Malmö Konsthall, Malmö
 Lunds Konsthall, Lund
 Ólafur Elíasson, 101 gallery, Reykjavík
 Ólafur Elíasson: The Colour Spectrum Series, Niels Borch Jensen Galerie und Verlag, Berlin
 Ólafur Elíasson: Meant to be lived in (Today I feel prismatic), Emi Fontana West of Rome, Los Angeles, [USA].
 Ólafur Elíasson: The endless study, Foksal Gallery Foundation, Warsaw

2006 
 The Collectivity Project / Fellesprosjektet, Nasjonalmuseet for Kunst, Arkitektur og Design, Oslo
 Your Uncertainty of Colour Matching Experiment (in cooperation with Boris Oicherman), Ikon Gallery, Birmingham
 Your constants are changing, Gallery Koyanagi, Tokyo
 Caminos de Naturaleza, Fundación Telefónica, Madrid
 The endless study, Kiesler Stiftung, Vienna
 Mediating Space / A Laboratory, Aedes am Pfefferberg, Berlin
 Light Lab, Portikus, Frankfurt/ Main
 The Water Tower Concert. Project Sammlung (4), Kunsthaus Zug
 Your engagement sequence, Tanya Bonakdar Gallery, New York
 Remagine Large Version, Kunstmuseum, Bonn
 Your waste of time, neugerriemschneider, Berlin
 Omgivelser, Andersen’s Contemporary, Copenhagen

2008 
 50 Moons of Saturn, T2 Torino Triennale, Castello di Rivoli Museum of Contemporary Art, Turin, Italy
 Winter solstice, Equinox, Summer solstice, Jarla Partilager, Stockholm
 Your mobile expectations: BMW H2R project, Pinakothek der Moderne, Munchen
 The Nature of Things, Fundació Joan Miró, Barcelona
 Yellow fog, Verbund Collection, Vienna (permanent exhibition)
 New York City Waterfalls, East River, New York

2007 
 The shadow studies. Projekt Sammlung (5), Kunsthaus Zug
 SF MOMA
 PKM Gallery, Korea
 Serpentine Gallery

2009 
 Your chance encounter, 21st Century Museum of Contemporary Art, Kanazawa, Japan
 Andersen\\\'s Contemporary, Copenhagen
 i8 Gallery, Reykjavik
 The Body as Brain: Projekt Summlung (6), Kunsthaus Zug
 The parliament of reality: A permanent outdoor installation at Bard College, Bard College, New York
 Mediating experience: Olafur Eliasson\\\'s books, Biblioteca Universitarua di Bologna, Bologna
 Sunspace for Shibukawa, permanent installation, Hara Museum ARC, Shibukawa, Japan
 Is the sky part of landscape, PKM Trinity Gallery, Seoul, Korea

2010 
 Utopia - Olafur Eliasson, ARKEN Museum of Modern Art, Ishøj, Denmark
 Multiple shadow house, Tanya Bonakdar Gallery, New York, NY
 Innen Stadt Außen, Martin-Gropius-Bau, as part of the Berliner festspiele, Berlin, Germany
 Kepler was wrong, Galería Elvira González, Madrid
 Olafur Eliasson & Ma Yansong: Feelings are facts, Ullens Center for Contemporary Art, Beijing
 When rainbows appear, site-commission, The Israel Museum, Jerusalem, Israel
 Olafur Eliasson: Notion Motion, Museum Boijmans Van Beuningen, Rotterdam, The Netherlands
 Your black horizon Art Pavilion, with David Adjaye, organized by Thyssen-Bornemisza Art Contemporary, Lopud Island, Croatia
 Olafur Eliasson: Feeling things, Gallery Koyanagi, Tokyo, Japan
 Cars in rivers, National Gallery of Iceland, Reykjavík

2011 
 Your emotional future, PinchukArtCentre, Kiev, Ukraine
 Your rainbow panorama, ARoS Aarhus Kunstmuseum, Aarhus, Denmark
 Olafur Eliasson: Your body of work, 17th International Contemporary Art Festival SESC_Videobrasil, SESC São Paulo, Brazil

2012 
 Your uncertain shadow, PKM Trinity Gallery, Seoul, Korea
 Little Sun, Tate Modern, London, UK
 Olafur Eliasson, Gerhardsen Gerner, Oslo, Norway
 Volcanos and shelters, Tanya Bonakdar Gallery, NY
 Volcanos and shelters, neugerriemschneider, Berlin, Germany

2014 
 Riverbed, Louisiana Museum of Modern Art, Copenhagen, Denmark

2015 
Some 40 works from the Boros Collection are shown in the rooms of the Langen Foundation, Museumsinsel Hombroich, Neuss, Germany

 Cirkelbroen in Copenhagen, Denmark

2017 
 Musée d'art contemporain de Montréal, Montréal, Canada

2019 
 Tate Modern, London, England

Group exhibitions

1989

 Ventilator Projects, Charlottenborg Konsthall, Copenhagen

1990 
 Street Signs, BIZART, Copenhagen

1991
Overgaden, Copenhagen
 Young Scandinavian Art, Stalke Out of Space, Copenhagen

1992 
 Overdrive, 10 Young Nordic Artists, Projektraum, Copenhagen
 Lightworks, Demonstrationslokalet for Kunst, Copenhagen
 Paradise Europe, Poster Project, Copenhagen

1993 
 1700 CET, Stalke Out of Space, Copenhagen
 Black Box, GLOBE Kuratorengruppe, Copenhagen
 Opening Show, Galleri Nicolai Wallner, Copenhagen

1994 
 Europa, Ausstellung Münchner Galerien, Munich

1995 
 (Landschaft) mit dem Blick der 90er Jahre, Mittelrhein-Museum, Koblenz; Museum Schloss Burgk/Saale; Haus am Waldsee, Berlin
 Kunst & Ökologie, Kunstverein Schloss Plön
 Campo 95, Corderie dell'Arsenale, Venice; Fondazione Sandretto Re Rebaudengo, Turin

1996 
 Manifesta 1, The European Biennial of Contemporary Art, Rotterdam, Netherlands
 Nach Weimar, Kunstsammlungen zu Weimar
 Alles was modern ist, Galerie Bärbel Grässlin, Frankfurt am Main
 Tolv, Schaper Sundberg Gallery, Stockholm
 Prospect 96: Photographie in der Gegenwartskunst, Frankfurter Kunstverein and Schirn Kunsthalle Frankfurt
 Views of Icelandic Nature, Kjarvalsstadir, The Reykjavík Art Museum
 Provins-Legende, Museet for Samtidskunst, Roskilde
 Glow: Sublime Projected and Reflected Light, New Langton Arts, San Francisco
 The Scream: Borealis 8, Nordic Fine Arts, 1995–1996, ARKEN Museum for Moderne Kunst, Ishøj
 Summer Show, Tanya Bonakdar Gallery, New York
 Remote Connections, Neue Galerie Graz; Wäino Aaltonen Museum of Art, Turku; Artfocus, Tel Aviv
 Campo 95, Malmö Konstmuseum

1997 
 Été 97, Centre Genevois de Gravure Contemporaine, Geneva
 Kunstpreis der Böttcherstrasse in Bremen 1997, Bonner Kunstverein
 Heaven, P.S.1 Contemporary Art Center, New York
 On Life, Beauty, Translations and Other Difficulties: 5th International Istanbul Biennial, Istanbul
 Trade Routes: 2nd Johannesburg Biennale, Johannesburg
 Truce: Echoes of Art in an Age of Endless Conclusions, SITE Santa Fe
 Alikeness, Centre for Contemporary Photography, Fitzroy
 The Louisiana Exhibition: New Art from Denmark and Scania, Louisiana Museum for Moderne Kunst, Humlebæk
 Studija Islandija, Contemporary Art Centre, Vilnius
 3e Symposium en arts visuels de l'Abitibi-Témiscamingue, Centre d'exposition d'Amos
 Platser, Projects in Public Space, Stockholm
 Schauplatz Museumsquartier: Zur Transformation eines Ortes, Kunsthalle Wien
 Sightings: New Photographic Art, Institute of Contemporary Art, London
 Berlin Biennal, Berlin

1998 
 Sharawadgi, Felsenvilla, Baden
 Seamless, Stichting De Appel, Amsterdam
 Something Is Rotten in the State of Denmark, Museum Fridericianum, Kassel
 Do All Oceans Have Walls?, Städtische Galerie im Buntentor, Bremen
 Mai 98, Kunsthalle Köln
 Berlin/Berlin - 1st Berlin Biennale, Akademie der Künste; Postfuhramt; Kunst-Werke Berlin e.V., Institute for Contemporary Art, Berlin
 Auf der Spur, Kunsthalle Zürich
 Waterfall, Sydney Biennial, Sydney
 The very large ice floor, XXIV Bienal de São Paulo, São Paulo
 Cool Places: The 7th Triennial of Contemporary Art, Contemporary Art Center, Vilnius
 The Erotic Sublime (Slave to the Rhythm), Galerie Thaddaeus Ropac, Salzburg
 Transatlántico, Centro Atlántico de Arte Moderno, Las Palmas
 Stalke Anniversary Show, Stalke Galleri, Copenhagen
 Underground, Copenhagen
 Sightings: New Photographic Art, Institute of Contemporary Art, London
 Interferencias, Museo de Arte Contemporaneo, Madrid
 Warming, Project in Harlem, New York
 Round About Ways, Schloss Ujazdowski, Warsaw
 La Ville, le jardin, la mémoire, Villa Medici, Académie de France à Rome
 Light x Eight: The Hanukkah Project, The Jewish Museum, New York
 Edstrandska Stiftelsens Konstnärsstipendiater 1998/The Edstrand Foundation Art Prize 1998, Rooseum, Center for Contemporary Art, Malmö
 New Photography 14: Jeanne Dunning, Ólafur Elíasson, Rachel Harrison, Sam Taylor-Wood, The Museum of Modern Art, New York
 Dad's Art, neugerriemschneider, Berlin
 Nuit blanche, La jeune scène nordique, Musée d'Art Moderne de la Ville de Paris; Reykjavík Municipal Art Museum; Bergen Billedgalleri; Porin Taidemuseo; Göteborgs Konstmuseum
 Kunst & Windenergie zur Weltausstellung, Rathaus der Landeshauptstadt Hannover
 Pakkhus: MOMENTUM Nordic Festival of Contemporary Art, Moss
 Brytningstider, Norrköpings Konstmuseum
 StadtLandschaften, Sabine Kunst Galerie & Edition, Munich

1999 
 Carnegie International, 1999/2000, Carnegie Museum of Art, Pittsburgh
 Schöpfung, Karmelitenkirche (Munich); Diözesanmuseum Freising; Heilig-Geist-Kirche, Landshut Skulptur-Biennale 1999 im Münsterland, Münsterland
 Ólafur Elíasson, Vadim Fikin, Marko Peljhan, Eulàlia Valldosera – … incommensurabilis –, Galerija Skuc, Ljubljana
 Can You Hear Me? 2. Ars Baltica Triennale der Photokunst, Stadtgalerie im Sophienhof, Kiel; Rostock Art Gallery; Contemporary Art Centre, Vilnius; Kunst Haus Dresden; Bergens Kunstforening, Bergen; Galleria Otso, Espoo
 German Open: Gegenwartskunst in Deutschland, Kunstmuseum Wolfsburg
 Saman taivaan alla: Taidetta kaupungissa, 1999-2000: Under samma himmel/ Under the Same Sky, Kiasma, Museum of Contemporary Art, Helsinki
 To the People of the City of the Euro, Frankfurter Kunstverein, Frankfurt am Main
 Photography from the Martin Z. Margulies Collection, The Art Museum at Florida International University, Miami
 The Midnight Sun Show, Lofoten
 Panorama 2000, Centraal Museum, Utrecht
 Sommerens mørke og lyse nætter, Aarhus Kunstbygning
 Overflow, Marianne Boesky & D'Amelio-Terras & Anton Kern Galleries, New York
 Photography: An Expanded View: Recent Acquisitions, Solomon R. Guggenheim Museum, New York
 Arte all'Arte, Arte Continua, Casole d'Elsa, San Gimignano
 Landscape: Outside the Frame, MIT List Visual Art Center, Cambridge
 Drawings, Bonakdar Jancou Gallery, New York
 Children of Berlin, P.S.1 Contemporary Art Center, New York
 dAPERTutto, Venice Biennale, Venice
 Dreams, Fondazione Sandretto Re Rebaudengo, Turin
 Blown Away, 6th International Caribbean Biennial, The Golden Lemon, St. Kitts
 Eingeladen/ Uitgenodigd, ACHK – De Paviljoens, Al Almere
 Next Stop, Kunstfestivalen Lofoten
 Galeria Heinrich Eberhardt, Madrid
 Focused, Galerie Tanit, Munich
 Konstruktionszeichnungen, Kunstwerke, Berlin
 Wånas 1999, Malmö Konstmuseum, Malmö
 Kulturviertel/Sophienhof Kiel; Kunsthalle, Rostock

2000 
 Joyce Event, Merce Cunningham Dance Company, Joyce Theater
 Wonderland, The Saint Louis Art Museum, St. Louis
 The Greenhouse Effect, Serpentine Gallery, London
 Times Are Changing: Auf dem Wege! Aus dem 20. Jahrhundert! Eine Auswahl von Werken der Kunsthalle Bremen, 1950–2000, Kunsthalle Bremen
 Raumkörper: Netze und andere Gebilde, Kunsthalle Basel
 Preis der Nationalgalerie für junge Kunst, Nationalgalerie im Hamburger Bahnhof, Museum für Gegenwart, Berlin
 Syndrome, IASPIS Galleriet, Stockholm
 Vision og virkelighed: Forestillinger om det 20. århundrede/ Vision and Reality: Conceptions of the 20th Century, Louisiana Museum for Moderne Kunst, Humlebæk
 Naust, Øygarden
 Photogravüre, Niels Borch Jensen Galerie und Verlag, Berlin
 ForwArt, BBL, Brussels
 Over the Edges, SMAK Stedelijk Museum voor Actuele Kunst, Ghent
 Wanås 2000, Stiftelsen Wanås Utställningar, Knislinge
 Bleibe, Akademie der Künste, Berlin
 Organising Freedom, Moderna Museet, Stockholm
 North: A New Conceptual Landscape, Aspen Art Museum
 Under the same sky, Kiasma, Helsinki
 Benesse Prize Winners in Naoshima, Naoshima Contemporary Art Museum, Kagawa
 The First Works at Kilchmann, Galerie Peter Kilchmann, Zürich
 On paper, Stalke Galleri, Copenhagen
 International Garden Show, Graz
 Paula Cooper Gallery, New York
 Drawings, Sommer Contemporary Art, Tel Aviv

2001 
 Everything Can Be Different, Jean Paul Slusser Gallery, University of Michigan School of Art and Design, Ann Arbor; Art Museum, University of Memphis; Maryland Institute College of Art, Baltimore
 Black Box: Der Schwarzraum in der Kunst, Kunstmuseum Bern
 Aubette: Het verlangen naar een (andere) plaats, Museum Dhondt-Dhaenens, Deurle
 Freestyle: Werke aus der Sammlung Boros, Museum Morsbroich, Leverkusen
 En pleine terre: Eine Wanderung zwischen Landschaft und Kunst, Spiral Jetty und Potsdamer Schrebergärten, Museum für Gegenwartskunst der Öffentlichen Kunstsammlungen Basel und der Emanuel Hoffmann-Stiftung
 Form Follows Fiction/ Forma e finzione nell'arte di oggi, Castello di Rivoli, Museo d'Arte Contemporanea, Turin
 The Waste Land: Wüste und Eis: Ödlandschaften in der Fotografie, Zentrum für zeitgenössische Kunst der Österreichischen Galerie Belvedere, Atelier Augarten, Vienna
 Vision og virkelighed: Forestillinger om det 20. århundrede/ Vision and Reality: Conceptions of the 20th Century, Louisiana Museum for Moderne Kunst, Humlebæk
 Palomino, Galerie für Zeitgenössische Kunst, Leipzig
 Plus vrai que nature, capc Musée d'art contemporain, Bordeaux
 Confronting Nature, Corcoran Gallery of Art, Washington D.C.
 Neue Welt, Frankfurter Kunstverein, Frankfurt am Main
 Yokohama 2001; International Triennale of Contemporary Art, Yokohama
 En el Cielo, Venice Biennale, Basel 32, Venice
 All-Terrain: An Exploration of Landscape and Place, Contemporary Art Center of Virginia
 New Work, Tanya Bonakdar Gallery, New York
 New Acquisitions from the Dakis Joannou Collection, Deste Foundation, Centre for Contemporary Art, Athens

2002 
 Moving Pictures: Contemporary Photography and Video from the Guggenheim Museum Collections, Solomon R. Guggenheim Museum, New York; Guggenheim Bilbao
 Rent-a-Bench, Los Angeles; Trapholt Museum, Kolding
 Topos/Atopos/Anatopos, CCNOA, Brussels
 Ars Lucis et Umbrae, Museum im Palais Kinsky, Vienna
 Void, Rice Gallery G2, Tokyo
 Regarding Landscape, Art Gallery of York University, Toronto; The Koffler Gallery, Toronto; Museum of Contemporary Canadian Art, Toronto; Liane and Danny Taran Gallery, Saidye Bronfman Center for the Arts, Montreal
 Dialoghi Europei d'Arte: Città di Napoli, Castel dell'Ovo and Castel Nuovo, Naples
 El Aire es Azul/The Air Is Blue, Casa Museo Luis Barragán, Mexico City
 From the Cool Light, Niels Borch Jensen Galerie und Verlag, Berlin
 Mirror Mirror, Massachusetts Museum of Contemporary Art, North Adams
 No Return, Städtisches Museum Abteiberg, Mönchengladbach
 Ars Photographica: Fotografie und Künstlerbücher, Neues Museum Weserburg, Bremen
 Claude Monet ... bis zum digitalen Impressionismus, Fondation Beyeler, Riehen
 Oluf Høst i dialog med nutiden, Aarhus Kunstmuseum
 The Hugo Boss Prize 2002, Solomon R. Guggenheim Museum, New York
 Tomorrow's fish 'n chips, Autocenter, Berlin-Friedrichshain
 The Object Sculpture, Henry Moore Institute, Leeds
 Thin Skin: The Fickle Nature of Bubbles, Spheres, and Inflatable Structures AXA Gallery, New York; Scottsdale Museum of Contemporary Art; Gemeentemuseum Helmond; International Museum of Art and Science, McAllen (Texas); Chicago Cultural Center; Edwin A. Ulrich Museum of Art, Wichita State University; Boise Art Museum; International Museum of Art and Science in McAllen; Bedford Gallery, Regional Center for the Arts
 From the Observatory, Paula Cooper Gallery, New York
 Narrando espacios, tiempos, historias, XXVII Bienal de Arte de Pontevedra, Pazo da Cultura de Pontevedra
 Diamanti: Arte, Storia, Scienza, Scuderie del Quirinale, Rome
 Radar: Electronic Integration, Copenhagen and Malmö
 Der reflektierender Korridor. Entwurf zum Stoppen des freien Falls, Zentrum für international Lichtkunst, Unna
 Next, Curated by Hans-Ulrich Obrist, Do it @e-flux.com
 Acquiring Taste, Real Art Ways, Hartford, CT
 Thisplay, Colección Jumex, Mexico

2003 
 The new geometry, Galeria Fortes Vilaca, São Paulo
 The Fifth System: Public Art In The Age Of "Post-Planning", The 5th Shenzhen International, Shenzhen Public Art Exhibition
 Telefónica's Contemporary Photography Collection, Telefónica Foundation, Madrid
 In Full View, Andrea Rosen Gallery, New York
 Fra objektiv til objekt, Den Frie Udstillingsbygning, Copenhagen
 Sitings: Installation Art, 1969–2002, Museum of Contemporary Art, Los Angeles
 A Nova Geometria, Galeria Fortes Vilaça, São Paulo
 Art Against Stigma, Statens Museum for Kunst, Copenhagen
 The Origin of Things: Design Award Rotterdam: Imaging Ulysses, Museum Boijmans van Beuningen, Rotterdam
 Hands up, Baby, Hands up, Oldenburger Kunstverein
 Support: Die Neue Galerie als Sammlung, Neue Galerie am Landesmuseum Joanneum, Graz
 The Straight or Crooked Way, Royal College of Art, London
 Edén, Antiguo Colegio de San Ildefonso, Mexico City
 See History 2003: Eine Sammlung wird ausgestellt, Kunsthalle zu Kiel der Christian-Albrechts-Universität, Schleswig-Holsteinischer Kunstverein, Kiel
 No Art = No City! Stadtutopien in der zeitgenössischen Kunst, Städtische Galerie im Buntentor, Bremen
 ARKENS Samling 2003, ARKEN Museum for Moderne Kunst, Ishøj
 Einbildung – Das Wahrnehmen in der Kunst, Kunsthaus Graz
 Spoleto Science Festival, Spoleto
 Tirana Biennale 2, Tirana
 Svjetlina: Djela iz Thyssen-Bornemisza Zaklade za suvremenu umjetnost/ Brightness: Works from the Thyssen-Bornemisza Contemporary Art Foundation, Museum of Modern Art, Dubrovnik
 Imperfect Marriages, Galleria Emi Fontana, Milan
 Frankenstein, Tanya Bonakdar Gallery, New York
 Air, James Cohan Gallery, New York
 Island in Danmark, Galleri Kirke Sonnerup, Såby
 Revisitar Canarias/The Canary Islands Revisited, Galería Elba Benítez, Madrid
 Ars Photographica: Fotografie und Künstlerbücher, Neues Museum Weserburg, Bremen
 Double Exposure: 14 fotografische Diptychen, Galerie und Edition Schellmann, Munich
 Topos/Atopos/Anatopos, CCNOA, Brussels
 Imperfect Innocence: The Debra and Dennis Scholl Collection, Contemporary Museum, Baltimore; Palm Beach Institute of Contemporary Art, Lake Worth
 Manifestation Internationale d'Art de Quebec, Quebec
 Add to it: Louise Lawler (pictures), Ólafur Elíasson & Zumtobel Staff (light), Tobias Rehberger (space), Portikus im Leinwandhaus, Frankfurt am Main
 After the Observatory, Paula Cooper Gallery, New York
 Imagination - Perception in Art, Landesmuseum Joanneum, Kunsthaus Steiermark
 Utopia Station Poster Project, Haus der Kunst Munich
 Warped Space, Wattis Institute for Contemporary Arts, San Francisco
 In full view, Andrea Rosen Gallery, New York
 Nuevos Proyectos/New Projects, NMAC Foundation, Madrid
 Everything can be different, Maryland Institute College of Art, Baltimore
 The Canary Islands Revisited, Galeria elba Bnitez, Madrid

2004 
 Los usos de la imagen, Fotografía, film y video, La Colección Jumex, Buenos Aires
  – the multiple shop of Stockholm, Galleri Charlotte Lund, Stockholm
 The Nature Machine: Contemporary Art, Nature and Technology, Queensland Art Gallery, South Brisbane
 Dicen que finjo o miento. La ficciòn revisada, Central de Arte, Guadalajara
 Modus Operandi, T-B A21, Vienna
 Wow, Henry Art Gallery & Western Bridge, Seattle
 Stadtlicht-Lichtkunst, Wilhelm-Lehmbruck-Museum, Duisburg
 Invisible, Palazzo delle Papesse Centro Arte Contemporanea, Siena
 Bewegliche Teile. Formen des Kinetischen, Kunsthaus Graz am Landesmuseum Joanneum
 Parallele 64 – Art Contemporain Islandais, Espace d'art contemporain Gustave Fayet, Sérignan
 The Encounters in the 21st Century: Polyphony - Emerging Resonances, 21st Century Museum of Modern Art, Kanazawa
 Utopia Station, Mostra d'Oltre Mare, Naples
 Utopia Station, Haus der Kunst, Munich
 ein-leuchten, Museum der Moderne, Salzburg
 Recherche - endeckt! Bildarchive der Unsichtbarkeiten, 6. Internationale Foto-Triennale, Villa Merkel und Bahnwärterhäuschen, Esslingen am Neckar
 monument to now, The Dakis Joannou Collection, Athens
 Reflecting the mirror, Marian Goodman Gallery, New York
 Everything is connected he, he, he, Astrup Fearnley Museum of Modern Art, Oslo
 Why not live for art, Tokyo Opera City Art Gallery, Tokyo
 Atomkrieg, Kunsthaus Dresden
 Landscape ?2, Towner Art Gallery, Eastbourne
 Nouvelles Collections, CentrePasquArt, Bel Bienne
 Story, Myth and dream, Statens Museum for Kunst, Copenhagen
 La relatividad del tiempo y los  sistemas de referencia, Oficina para Proyectos de Arte A.C., Guadalajara
 Imágenes en movimiento/ Moving Pictures, Guggenheim Bilbao
 Double Exposure, Brigitte March, Stuttgart
 Werke aus der Sammlung Boros, Museum für Neue Kunst/ZKM, Karlsruhe
 realityREAL: Arbeiten auf Papier, Galerie Gebr. Lehmann, Dresden
 Game of Life, Elías Hjörleifsson and Ólafur Elíasson, Hafnarborg, Hafnarfjardar
 Deste Foundation Centre for Contemporary Art Athens, Greece
 Biennale 2004, Museum of New Art, Detroit

2005 
 Out there: Landscape in the New Millennium, Museum of Contemporary Art, Cleveland
 Desenhos: A-Z (Drawings: A-Z), Colecção Madeira Corporate Services, Porta 33, Funchal, Ilha da Madeira, Portugal
 Material Time/Work Time/Life Time, Reykjavík Arts Festival, Iceland
 Making things public – Atmospheres of Democracy, ZKM, Karlsruhe
 Prolog + mission of art, Akademie der Künste, Berlin
 Always a little further, Venice Biennale, Arsenale
 Our Surroundings, Dundee Contemporary Arts, Scotland
 Einstein Spaces, Potsdam, Germany
 Collección De Fotografía Contemporánea de Telefónica, Museo de Arte Contemporánea de Vigo, Spain
 Der Kunst Ihre Räume, Bonner Kunstverein
 Atlantic and Bukarest, Kunstmuseum Basel
 Remagine. Œuvres du Fonds National d’Art Contemporain, Musée d’Art Contemporain, Lyon
 Emergencias, Museo de Arte Contemporénneo de Castilla y Léon, Léon
 Dialog Skulptur, Kunstforum Seelingstadt
 Das verlorene Paradies, Die Landschaft in der Zeitgenössichen Photographie, Stiftung Opelvillen, Rüsselsheim
 Wolkenbilder, Aargauer Kunsthaus, Aarau
 Ecstasy: In and About Altered States, Museum of Contemporary Art, Los Angeles
 First Acquisitions. A selection of works from the Foundation for Contemporary Art Victor Pinchuk, Venice
 Die Ordnung der Natur, Museum Moderner Kunst, Passau
 Send min ven i skole, Hele verden i skole 2005, Københavns Bymuseum, Copenhagen, Denmark
 Send my Friend to School, Global Campaign for Education, South Bank, London, Great Britain

2006 
 Out of Place, The New Art Gallery Walsall, West Midlands
 No. 14 Light Play, Z33, Hasselt
 The François Pinault Collection, a Post-Pop Selection, Palazzo Grassi, Venice
 Gletscherdämmerung, ERES-Stiftung, Munich
 Der Blaue Reiter im 21. Jahrhundert, Lenbachhaus, Munich
 Open House / Casa Aberta, INHOTIM centro de arte contemporânea, Minas Gerais, Brazil
 FASTER! BIGGER! BETTER!, ZKM Zentrum für Kunst und Medien Technologie, Karlsruhe
 Exhibition of Contemporary Art “New Space”, Pinchuk Art Centre, Kiev
 Eye on Europe: Prints, Books & Multiples / 1960 to Now, The Museum of Modern Art, New York
 After Cage - 24 Collections in Motion, Aachen – Liége – Hasselt – Maastricht
 Convertible City, German Pavillon, 10th International Architecture Exhibition, Venice
 Not All Is Visible / Works from the Astrup Fearnley Collection, Astrup Fearnley Museum of Modern Art, Oslo
 Surprise, Surprise, Institute of Contemporary Arts, London
 Visuell – Blind Date. Neuerwerbungen der Sammlung Deutsche Bank, Galerie Kunstforum, Altes Haus, Seligenstadt
 Fantastic Politics, The National Museum of Contemporary Art, Oslo
 Testigos / Witnesses, NMAC Foundation, Madrid
 Anstoss Berlin – Kunst macht Welt, Haus am Waldsee, Berlin
 Rauminszenierungen 2006, Gartenlandschaft OstWestfalenLippe, Bielefeld
 The Expanded Eye, Kunsthaus Zürich, Zurich
 Landscape: Recent Acquisitions, The Museum of Modern Art, New York
 Bühne des Lebens – Rhetorik des Gefühls, Städtische Galerie im Lenbachhaus und Kunstbau München, Munich
 Nature Attitudes, Thyssen-Bornemisza Art Contemporary, Vienna
 Intensive Science, La Maison Rouge, Paris
 Peace Tower, Whitney Museum of American Art, New York
 Constructing New Berlin, Phoenix Art Museum, Arizona
 The Garden Party, Deitch Projects, New York
 SHIFTscale, KUMU / The Art Museum of Estonia, Tallinn
 Galleri MGM, Oslo
 Bjerge I Dansk Kunst – fra Willumsen til Parfyme, Herning Kunstmuseum, Herning
 Botanical Garden, Jardín Botánico Culiacán, Mexico
 Between Art and Life: The Contemporary Painting and Sculpture Collection, SFMOMA San Francisco Museum of Modern Art
 Where are we going? Palazzo Grassi, Venice
 The clouds between us – and other works from the Moderna Museet’s collection, Moderna Museet, Stockholm
 Premio Biella per l’incisione: Arte nell’eta dell’ansia, Museo del Territorio Biellese, Biella
 Das erste Blick, Sammlung GAG, Weimar
 Dialog Skulptur, Kunstverein Ludwigshafen

2007 
 Your House, Walker Art Center, Minneapolis, Minnesota
 Migratory Esthetics, Zuiderzeemuseum, Enkhuizen

References 

Eliasson, Olafur
Eliasson

da:Olafur Eliasson
de:Ólafur Elíasson
es:Olafur Eliasson
ja:オラファー・エリアソン
sv:Ólafur Elíasson